Scopula laresaria is a moth of the  family Geometridae. It is found in Puerto Rico.

References

Moths described in 1940
laresaria
Moths of the Caribbean